An intimidator is a person who employs intimidation.

(The) Intimidator(s) may also refer to:

Nickname for Dale Earnhardt
"(The) Intimidator" was a nickname of NASCAR driver Dale Earnhardt (1951-2001).

Intimidator (roller coaster), at Carowinds amusement park
Intimidator 305, a roller coaster at Kings Dominion amusement park
Kannapolis Intimidators, a minor-league baseball team which Earnhardt owned at the time of his death
 Intimidators Stadium, the home venue of the baseball team
 Chevrolet Silverado Intimidator SS, a 2006 special edition of the Siliverado SS pickup truck line

Books
 The Intimidators, a 1974 novel by Donald Hamilton, fifteenth in the Matt Helm secret agent novel series

Other uses
 Intimidators (comics), a 2005 Image Comics mini-series
 Bob Long Intimidator, an electropneumatic paintball marker that was manufactured by Bob Long Technologies

See also